The Amaradia is a river in southern Romania. It is a left tributary of the river Jiu, and flows into the Jiu near the city Craiova. The Amaradia flows through the villages Roșia de Amaradia, Bustuchin, Logrești-Moșteni, Logrești, Hurezani, Crușeț, Melinești, Goiești, Șimnicu de Sus and Ișalnița.

Tributaries

The following rivers are tributaries to the river Amaradia (from source to mouth):

Left: Strâmba, Seaca, Valea Hartanului, Amărăzuia, Slăvuța, Văluța, Plosca, Valea Șarpelui

Right: Poienița, Gâlcești, Negreni, Totea, Plopu, Găgâi, Valea Boului, Valea Muierii, Ploștina, Brebina

References

Rivers of Romania
Rivers of Gorj County
Rivers of Dolj County